Spencer Jones (born September 22, 1994) is an American professional baseball pitcher.

Jones went to Edward C. Reed High School in Sparks, Nevada, graduating in 2012. He began his college baseball career at Mendocino College. After two years, he transferred to the University of Washington to play for the Washington Huskies for two more seasons.

The Tampa Bay Rays selected Jones in the 10th round, with the 300th selection, of the 2016 MLB draft. He received a $10,000 signing bonus, despite the $156,000 slot value for the pick, and made his professional debut with the Hudson Valley Renegades. He played for the United States national baseball team in the 2019 WBSC Premier12.

References

External links

1994 births
Living people
Sportspeople from Sparks, Nevada
Baseball pitchers
Mendocino Eagles baseball players
Washington Huskies baseball players
Hudson Valley Renegades players
Bowling Green Hot Rods players
Charlotte Stone Crabs players
Surprise Saguaros players
Montgomery Biscuits players
St. Paul Saints players
Acereros de Monclova players
Águilas Cibaeñas players
Sioux City Explorers players
2019 WBSC Premier12 players